Hristo Ignatov (born 1 December 1953) is a Bulgarian former wrestler who competed in the 1972 Summer Olympics.

References

External links
 

1953 births
Living people
Olympic wrestlers of Bulgaria
Wrestlers at the 1972 Summer Olympics
Bulgarian male sport wrestlers
Place of birth missing (living people)
20th-century Bulgarian people
21st-century Bulgarian people